Pristimantis colomai is a species of frog in the family Strabomantidae.
It is found in Colombia and Ecuador.
Its natural habitats are tropical moist lowland forests and moist montane forests.
It is threatened by habitat loss.

References

colomai
Amphibians of Colombia
Amphibians of Ecuador
Amphibians described in 1997
Taxonomy articles created by Polbot